This was the first edition of the tournament.

Elena Likhovtseva and Iroda Tulyaganova won in the final, defeating Eugenia Kulikovskaya and Tatiana Poutchek 6–4, 6–4.

Seeds

Draw

Main

References
 Draw

2003 WTA Tour
Bangalore Open